The Second Christensen Cabinet was the government of Denmark from 24 July 1908 to 12 October 1908.

It was replaced by the Neergaard I Cabinet on 12 October 1908.

List of ministers and portfolios
Some of the terms being before 24 July 1908 because the minister was in the First Christensen Cabinet as well. The cabinet consisted of:

References

1908 establishments in Denmark
1908 disestablishments
Cabinets of Denmark